Syed Zaheer Abbas Kirmani PP, (in Punjabi and Urdu: سید ظہیر عباس کرمانی; born 24 July 1947), popularly known as Zaheer Abbas, is a former Pakistani cricketer. He is among few professional cricketers who used to wear spectacles. In 1982/1983, he became the first batsman to score three consecutive centuries in one-day internationals. Sometimes known as 'the Asian Bradman', Zaheer Abbas is regarded as one of the finest batsmen in the history of cricket World. In August 2020, he was inducted to the ICC Cricket Hall of Fame.

Career
Abbas made his Test match debut in 1969; in his second Test he scored 274 against England, which is still the sixth-ever highest score by a Pakistani batsman. This was the first of his four Test double-centuries; only two men from Pakistan (Younis Khan and Javed Miandad) have scored more. The last was an innings of 215 against India in 1983, the first of three centuries in consecutive Tests, and his hundredth first-class century; Abbas and Geoffrey Boycott are the only two batsmen to have scored their hundredth first-class century in a Test match.

Abbas had great success in first-class cricket, and is the only Asian batsman to score one hundred first-class centuries. He had a long stint with Gloucestershire; joining the county in 1972, he remained there for thirteen years. During that time he scored over a thousand runs in the majority of his thirteen seasons. He also made over two thousand runs in a single season on two occasions for the club (1976 and 1981). During those thirteen years at Gloucestershire, he played 206 first-class games, scoring over 16,000 runs. He averaged 49.79, hitting 49 hundreds and 76 fifties. Abbas is the only player to have scored a century and double century in a first-class match four times, finishing each of the eight innings not out.

Sunil Gavaskar, the former Indian Test captain, once said while commentating that the Indian players would often say to Zaheer, "Zaheer Ab-bas karo", which means "Zaheer, stop it now" in Urdu and Hindi, referring to Abbas' free scoring.

Abbas had two stints as captain of the national team in 1981 and 1984. He retired from international cricket in 1985, and has officiated as a match referee in one Test and three ODI matches. He has also worked as the manager of the national team. Zaheer was one of the player who was famous for his title. Zaheer Abbas was called Asian Bradman. In 2018 Government of Pakistan awarded him Sitara-e-Imtiaz. In 2015 he became ICC president, the third cricketer after Colin Cowdrey and Clyde Walcott, to hold the post.

Zaheer Abbas held the record for scoring the most runs by any batsman in a 4 match bilateral ODI series (346 runs) from 1982 to 2015. The record was broken by Hashim Amla of South Africa in 2015.

Personal life
Zaheer Abbas married Indian born Rita Luthra (now known as Samina Abbas) in 1988.

His first marriage was to Najma Bokhari with whom he has three daughters, Rudabah, Roshana and Hiba.

Autobiography
In 1983 he co-wrote his autobiography Zed with the British cricket journalist David Foot.

Awards and recognition
Pride of Performance Award in 1971 by the Government of Pakistan
Inducted in ICC Cricket Hall of Fame in 2020.
Inducted in PCB Hall of Fame in 2021.

References

External links
 

1947 births
Living people
Punjabi people
Cricketers from Sialkot
Pakistan Test cricketers
Pakistani cricket captains
Pakistan One Day International cricketers
Pakistan Test cricket captains
Gloucestershire cricketers
Karachi cricketers
Pakistan International Airlines cricketers
Public Works Department cricketers
Sindh cricketers
World Series Cricket players
Wisden Cricketers of the Year
Cricketers at the 1975 Cricket World Cup
Cricketers at the 1979 Cricket World Cup
Cricketers at the 1983 Cricket World Cup
Dawood Industries cricketers
Recipients of the Pride of Performance
Pakistani cricketers
Karachi Whites cricketers
Karachi Blues cricketers
Pakistan International Airlines A cricketers
Sind A cricketers
Presidents of the International Cricket Council